Matryoshka Radio London is an independent commercial music radio station. On air 24/7, Matryoshka Radio London is the first Russian language radio station to have secured a  British broadcasting licence. It has been broadcasting on digital audio broadcasting (DAB)  in London since 27 November 2015.

Matryoshka's logo represents a stylised matryoshka doll sporting headphones and the name of the station, Matryoshka Radio London, as well as the technology it broadcasts in, DAB.

References

External links
Радиоведущие.ру 
Журнал "Международная жизнь": интервью с Креативным директором Matryoshka Radio Николаем Крупатиным
Подкасты Matryoshka Radio https://itunes.apple.com/ru/podcast/matryoshka-radio/id1082732761?mt=2 
Публикации в прессе: 
http://www.tophit.ru/news/view/partners/6648 
http://www.tophit.ru/news/view/partners/6581 
http://onair.ru/main/enews/view_msg/NMID__60579/
http://mediaprofi.org/media-info/press-releases/item/5468-matreshka

Radio stations in London